The fourth season of Gilmore Girls, an American dramedy television series, began airing on September 23, 2003 on The WB. The season concluded on May 18, 2004, after 22 episodes. The season aired Tuesday nights at 8/7c.

On December 17, 2003, The WB announced that the show was renewed for a fifth season.

Overview
Rory begins attending Yale and discovers Paris has arranged for them to be roommates. At first Rory seems to be adjusting to college life fairly well, but eventually finds the workload to be overwhelming. Paris begins a romance with a much older professor, Asher Flemming, and breaks up with her boyfriend.

Lorelai oversees renovations on the Dragonfly Inn. Although Sookie is pregnant, she and Lorelai start a catering business to make ends meet. As the construction drags on, Lorelai feels the financial crunch. After Sookie gives birth, she is distracted with the baby and Lorelai is resentful for having to shoulder more responsibility concerning the Inn.

Richard is hard at work with his new insurance business, and takes on Jason Stiles as a partner. Lorelai and Jason begin dating, but she insists they keep the relationship a secret from her parents. When the Richard's business and wealth are threatened by a lawsuit, he throws Jason under the bus. Lorelai and Emily are angry about Richard's behavior. However, when Jason feels he must sue Richard in retaliation, Lorelai breaks up with him. A rift develops between Richard and Emily that culminates in their separation.

Dean marries his high school girlfriend, Lindsay, despite having lingering feelings for Rory. He gets work on the Inn's construction crew. His marriage hits a rocky patch when Lindsay wants to buy a house and Dean may have to drop out of college to earn enough money.

Luke's historically flaky sister Liz, seems to have found stability as a jewelry maker on the Renaissance fair circuit. Jess returns to get his car, and asks Rory to runaway with him but she refuses. Liz marries T.J, a dim-witted but kind man. Luke and Lorelai go out on a date and he expresses that he's serious about pursuing a relationship with her.

When the Dragonfly Inn has a test-run, Jason shows up and is in denial that he and Lorelai have broken up. Luke and Lorelai confirm they are dating. Rory loses her virginity to Dean, despite him still being married to Lindsay. Lorelai is upset when she finds out and has a fight with Rory.

Cast

Main cast
 Lauren Graham as Lorelai Gilmore, Rory's mother.
 Alexis Bledel as Rory Gilmore, Lorelai's daughter.
 Melissa McCarthy as Sookie St. James, Lorelai's best friend and co-worker.
 Scott Patterson as Luke Danes, the owner of the local diner.
 Keiko Agena as Lane Kim, Rory's best friend.
 Yanic Truesdale as Michel Gerard, Lorelai and Sookie's co-worker.
 Liza Weil as Paris Geller, Rory's roommate and close friend.
 Sean Gunn as Kirk Gleason, a resident of Stars Hollow who works many jobs.
 Chris Eigeman as Jason Stiles, Richard's business partner and Lorelai's boyfriend.
 Kelly Bishop as Emily Gilmore, Lorelai's mother and Rory's grandmother.
 Edward Herrmann as Richard Gilmore, Lorelai's father and Rory's grandfather.

Recurring cast
 Jared Padalecki as Dean Forester, Rory's ex-boyfriend.
 Milo Ventimiglia as Jess Mariano, Luke's nephew and Rory's ex-boyfriend.
 Jackson Douglas as Jackson Belleville, Sookie's husband.
 Liz Torres as Miss Patty, the owner of the local dance studio.
 Emily Kuroda as Mrs. Kim, Lane's religious mother.
 Sally Struthers as Babette Dell, Lorelai and Rory's next-door neighbor.
 Ted Rooney as Morey Dell, Lorelai and Rory's next-door neighbor.
 Michael Winters as Taylor Doose, the owner of the local grocery store.
 Todd Lowe as Zach Van Gerbig, Lane's bandmate.
 John Cabrera as Brian Fuller, Lane's bandmate.
 Wayne Wilcox as Marty, Rory's classmate and good friend.
 Sebastian Bach as Gil, Lane's new bandmate.
 Danny Strong as Doyle McMaster, the editor of the Yale Daily News.
 Kathleen Wilhoite as Liz Danes, Luke's younger sister and Jess's mom.
 Michael DeLuise as TJ, Liz's fiancé.
 Rusty Schwimmer as Bruce, Sookie's midwife.

Guest
 Teal Redmann as Louise Grant, an old classmate of Paris and Rory.
 Shelly Cole as Madeline Lynn, an old classmate of Paris and Rory.
 David Clayton Rogers as Trevor, Rory's classmate.
 Teddy Dunn as Graham, Rory's classmate.
 Michael York as Asher Fleming, Paris's Yale Professor

Episodes

DVD release

References

Season
2003 American television seasons
2004 American television seasons